Sumenep Regency (Indonesian: Kabupaten Sumenep, Madurese: Kabhupatèn Songennep; [kabhupatɛn sɔŋǝnnǝp], Pèghu: كابوڤاتين سَوڠٓنّٓڤ, Carakan: ꦏꦧꦸꦥꦠꦺꦤ꧀ꦯꦺꦴꦔꦼꦤ꧀ꦤꦼꦥ꧀, Lontara': ᨀᨅᨘᨄᨈᨙ ᨔᨚᨂᨛᨊᨛ) is a regency of the East Java province, Indonesia. It has an area of 2,093.59 km2 and a population of 1,042,312 inhabitants according to the 2010 census (an increase from 985,981 from the previous census in 2000); the 2020 census resulted in a total of 1,124,436. The official estimate as at mid 2021 was 1,134,810. The regency occupies the eastern end of Madura island and also includes numerous islands to the east (primarily Talango, the Sapudi Islands, and the Kangean Islands), the north (the Masalembu Islands), and the south (the Giligenteng Islands) of Madura. It is bordered by the Pamekasan Regency to the west, Madura Strait to the south, and the Java Sea to the north and east. Its administrative capital is Sumenep. The airport nearby is Trunojoyo Airport with flights to Surabaya.

Geography and administration

Administrative boundaries

Sumenep Regency is located at the eastern end of Madura Island; it also includes 126 scattered islands located between 113 ° 32'54 "-116 ° 16'48" East Longitude and between 4 ° 55'-7 ° 24 'South latitude.

The regency is bordered to the south by the Strait of Madura and Bali Sea, to the north by the Java Sea, to the west by Pamekasan Regency (the only land border) and to the east by the Java Sea and Flores Sea.

Area

The total land area of Sumenep Regency is 2,093.59 km2: this was formerly quoted as comprising 179.32 km2 of settlements,  423.96 km2 of forest, 14.68 km2 of grass area or vacant land, 1,130.19 km2 of farm/moor/bush/field, 59.07 km2 of pool/aquaculture/brackish water/lakes/reservoirs/wetlands, and 63.41 km2 of "other" areas. The marine area of Sumenep Regency, with its vast diversity of marine resources and potential for fishery, is about 50,000 km ² +.

Administrative districts

Sumenep Regency is divided into twenty-seven districts (kecamatan), listed below with their areas and their populations at the 2010 census and the 2020 census, together with the official estimates as at mid 2021. The table also includes the location of the district administrative centres, and the number of administrative villages (328 rural desa and 4 urban kelurahan) in each district.

Sumenep Regency, besides including the eastern quarter of Madura Island, also includes many offshore islands - notably the Kangean Islands to the east of Madura, the smaller Sapudi Islands lying between Madura and the Kangean Islands, and Talango Island closer to Madura; it also includes the small Masalembu Islands to the north (between Madura and Kalimantan) and the Giligenteng Islands to the southeast of Madura. The mainland (i.e. the area on Madura Island itself) covers 1,156.21 km2 (with 796,614 inhabitants in mid 2021) consisting of 18 districts, while the various islands are 937.38 km2 in area (with 338,196 people in mid 2021), comprising 9 districts, with 128 islands, 46 inhabited. 

The districts are subdivided (as at 2007) into:
 Villages: 328 rural desa and 4 urban kelurahan
 Pillars of Citizens (RW): 1,774
 Neighborhoods (RT): 5,569

References

External links 

 East Java Government website
 Sumenep Regency Government website

Regencies of East Java
Madura Island